Phyllopetalia is a genus of dragonflies in the family Austropetaliidae. They are commonly known as Redspots.

All the species are endemic to Chile except for P. pudu which also occurs in Argentina.

The genus contains the following species:
Phyllopetalia altarensis  - Metropolitan Redspot
Phyllopetalia apicalis  - Narrow-flanged Redspot
Phyllopetalia apollo  - Apollo Redspot
Phyllopetalia excrescens  - Peaked Redspot
Phyllopetalia pudu  - Pudu Redspot
Phyllopetalia stictica  - Unicorn Redspot

References

Further reading
 
 
 

Austropetaliidae
Anisoptera genera
Taxa named by Edmond de Sélys Longchamps
Taxonomy articles created by Polbot